Richard Wallace (August 26, 1894 – November 3, 1951) was an American film director.

He began working in the editing department at Mack Sennett Studios in the early 1920s. He later moved on to rival Hal Roach Studios where he began directing two-reel films, on some of which he collaborated with Stan Laurel.  In 1926, Wallace began directing feature-length films.

Several of Wallace's memorable films include three Shirley Temple films, A Night to Remember (1943) with Loretta Young, and The Little Minister (1934) with Katharine Hepburn. He was a founding member of the Directors Guild of America. He died of a heart attack.

Filmography

 Starvation Blues (1925)
 Beware of Your Relatives (1925)
 Jiminy Crickets (1925)
 One Wild Night (1925)
 Ice Cold 1925) 
 Raggedy Rose (1926)
 Syncopating Sue (1926)
 The Merry Widower (1926)
 Along Came Auntie (uncredited, 1926)
 Never Too Old (1926)
 Madame Mystery (1926)
 So This Is Paris? (1926) short film; not the 1926 Lubitsch feature film
 Dizzy Daddies (1926)
 Tight Cargo (1926)
 What's the World Coming To? (1926)
 The Honeymoon Hotel (1926)
 A Texas Steer (1927)
 American Beauty (1927)
 The Poor Nut (1927)
 McFadden's Flats (1927)
 The Shopworn Angel (1928)
  The Butter and Egg Man (1928)
 Lady Be Good (1928)
 Heart Trouble (1928)
 River of Romance (1929)
 Innocents of Paris (1929)
 The Right to Love (1930)
 Anybody's War (1930)
 Seven Days' Leave (1930)
 The Road to Reno (1931)
 Kick In (1931)
 Man of the World (1931)
 Thunder Below (1932)
 Tomorrow and Tomorrow (1932)
 The Masquerader (1933)
 The Little Minister (1934)
 Eight Girls in a Boat (1934)
 Wedding Present (1936)
 Blossoms on Broadway (1937)
 John Meade's Woman (1937)
 The Under-Pup (1939)
 The Young in Heart (1938)
 Captain Caution (1940)
 She Knew All the Answers (1941)
 A Girl, a Guy, and a Gob (1941)
 The Wife Takes a Flyer (1942)
 Obliging Young Lady (1942)
 A Night to Remember (1942)
 My Kingdom for a Cook (1943)
 The Fallen Sparrow (1943)
 Bombardier (1943)
 Bride by Mistake (1944)
 Kiss and Tell (1945)
 It's in the Bag! (1945)
 Because of Him (1946)
 Tycoon (1947)
 Framed (1947)
 Sinbad the Sailor (1947)
 Let's Live a Little (1948)
 A Kiss for Corliss (1949)
 Adventure in Baltimore (1949)

References

External links

 
 

1894 births
1951 deaths
American film directors